Harmony: A New Way of Looking at Our World is a 2010 book written by Charles, Prince of Wales, with Tony Juniper and Ian Skelly. The book focuses on the world's environment which includes climate change, architecture and agriculture. The book has been translated into many different languages. There is also a children's edition of Harmony.

Reception
Harmony: A New Way of Looking at Our World received favourable reviews.

The International Making Cities Livable Council stated, "Harmony is truly a wise book. It shows how all the areas the Prince has addressed in the past – architecture and planning, agriculture, education, the arts, healthcare, society and economy – have all suffered as a result of our disconnect from Nature. Through outstanding examples and best practices, he shows how each field is beginning to heal through the exemplary work of individuals and groups around the globe."

In a review in The Guardian, Rowan Moore said that the book contains a number of "amateurish" mistakes, and is also inconsistent in its use of science—embracing scientific evidence when it supports a belief in climate change, but ignoring scientific evidence that casts doubt on alternative medicine.

In 2018, Edzard Ernst wrote that "Harmony is full of praise for even the most absurd forms of alternative therapies and bogus diagnostic tests." In Ernst's book More Good Than Harm? The Moral Maze of Complementary and Alternative Medicine he and ethicist Kevin Smith call Charles "foolish and immoral" and "conclude that it is not possible to practice alternative medicine ethically". Ernst further claimed that the private secretary of the then-Prince contacted the vice chancellor of Exeter University to investigate Ernst's complaints against the Smallwood Report which Charles had commissioned in 2005. While Ernst was "found not to be guilty of any wrong-doing, all local support at Exeter stopped, which eventually led to my early retirement."

Awards and recognitions

In 2010, a documentary aired on the NBC network which Charles narrated. The documentary was directed by Academy Award and Directors Guild Award nominee Stuart Sender. The New York Times called it "breathtaking and beautifully filmed."

The book won a Nautilus Book Award in 2011.

In 2012, The film premiered at Sundance Film Festival, receiving positive reviews.

References

External links

2010 non-fiction books
2010 in the environment
HarperCollins books
Environmental non-fiction books
Books by Charles III
Climate change books